Robert Galloway and Nathaniel Lammons were the defending champions but chose not to defend their title.

Pavel Kotov and Roman Safiullin won the title after defeating Dan Added and Albano Olivetti 7–6(8–6), 5–7, [12–10] in the final.

Seeds

Draw

References

External links
 Main draw

Challenger La Manche - Doubles
2020 Doubles